Daljit Shah was a Prince of the Gorkha Kingdom. He was active during the Unification of Nepal led by his brother, King Prithvi Narayan Shah.

He held the rank of Chautaria, and Kaji. Shah commanded various battles including the Capture of Palanchok, the Battle of Kirtipur, the Battle of Kavre, and the Battle of Makwanpur.

Shah and Bahadur Shah were allegedly conspiring against the Pratap Singh Shah to crown Bahadur Shah as the king of Nepal. When this was discovered, Daljit Shah and Bahadur Shah were imprisoned in Nuwakot.

References 

18th-century Nepalese nobility
18th-century Nepalese people
Nepalese Hindus
Nepalese princes
Nepalese prisoners and detainees
Prisoners and detainees of Nepal
People from Gorkha District
People of the Nepalese unification